Benin made its Paralympic Games début at the 2000 Summer Paralympics in Sydney, sending a single representative (Edouard Agboessi) to compete in athletics. The country has competed at every edition of the Summer Paralympics since then, but has never taken part in the Winter Paralympics. No competitor for Benin has ever won a medal.

Medal tables

Medals by Summer Games

Full results for Benin at the Paralympics

See also
 Benin at the Olympics

References